Căbești is a commune in Bihor County, Crișana, Romania, around 13 kilometers north of the town of Beiuș.

Administration
The commune is composed of five villages: Căbești, Goila, Gurbești, Josani and Sohodol.

Josani
The village has a population of about 350 people. The whole population is ethnic Romanian.

The river Valea Roșia flows through the village. The village has very beautiful landscapes, especially during the summer.

Gurbești
Gurbești is part of the Căbești commune. The river Valea Roșia flows alongside the village.

Almost all of the population of the village is ethnic Romanian.

Gurbești has a 300-year-old Orthodox church, one of the oldest churches in the area.

Education
Education in Căbești is composed of:
kindergarten
primary school
secondary school.

Institutions
The commune contains several institutions:
Town Hall
Postal Office
Local Bank Office
Police Department
Library
Primary and Secondary school
Orthodox Church

Most of these buildings are found in the center of the commune.

Demographics
The commune has a population of 2073 inhabitants.

According to the 2002 Census the population structure is:

 Romanians  96.39%
 Roma  3.31%
 Hungarians  0.14%
 Others  0.16%

Economy
The main economic sector is agriculture.

References

Communes in Bihor County
Localities in Crișana